Santosh Sleeba is an actor in Malayalam film industry.

Biography

Santosh Sleeba was born on 16 March 1972 in Ernakulam district. He did his diploma in pharmaceuticals. Started a living by helping his father's medical business. His passion for acting bloomed later when he got a break in the Mohanlal film, Grandmaster, as a cop. He then continued his career with films like Nakhangal, Spirit, Nee Ko Njaa Cha, Karmayodha. Surprisingly, he has played as a cop in all his films. He is also an integral part of Pooja Cricket tournament in Tripunitara and also plays an important part in Tripunitara Cricket club. He is also a part of Kerala Strikers of Celebrity Cricket League.

Filmography
Grandmaster - 2012
Nee Ko Njaa Cha - 2012
Spirit - 2012
Nakhangal - 2013
Karmayodha - 2013

References

http://www.metromatinee.com/artist/Santhosh%20Sleeba-5688
http://www.newindianexpress.com/cities/kochi/article1384171.ece
http://cricketarchive.com/Kerala/Players/260/260744/260744.html 

Malayali people
1972 births
People from Ernakulam district
Living people